The Houston-Galveston Area Council (H-GAC) is the region-wide voluntary association of local governments in the 13-county Gulf Coast Planning Region of Texas. The organization works with local government officials to solve problems across the area. H-GAC was founded in 1966.

The organization 
Based in Houston, the Houston-Galveston Area Council is a member of the Texas Association of Regional Councils. Its service area is 12,500 square miles and contains more than 6 million people in Southeast Texas. H-GAC is the regional organization through which local governments consider issues and cooperate in solving area-wide problems.  Through H-GAC, local governments also initiate efforts in anticipating and preventing problems.

H-GAC provides planning programs in most areas of shared governmental concern. All H-GAC programs are carried out under the policy direction of H-GAC’s local elected official Board of Directors. H-GAC is made up of the region's local governments and their elected officials. The organization works with public and private sector organizations and a host of volunteers.

Metropolitan Planning Organization
In 1974, the Governor of Texas designated a metropolitan planning organization (MPO) that includes eight H-GAC counties: Brazoria, Chambers, Fort Bend, Galveston, Harris, Liberty, Montgomery, and Waller. The H-GAC Board of Directors serves as the fiscal agent for the H-GAC MPO. The MPO's Policy Board is the Transportation Policy Council (TPC), an independent policy making body. The TPC's responsibilities include: adopting the Regional Transportation Plan; selecting all federally funded and most state-funded transportation projects (all projects with "regional significance"); conducting a continuing, comprehensive, collaborative planning process; and demonstrating that selected projects will not hinder regional progress towards emissions reduction.

Counties served
Austin
Brazoria
Chambers
Colorado
Fort Bend
Galveston
Harris
Liberty
Matagorda
Montgomery
Walker
Waller
Wharton

Largest cities in the region
Houston
Pasadena
Sugar Land
Baytown
Missouri City
Galveston
League City
Pearland
Conroe
Texas City
Huntsville
La Porte
Friendswood

See also 
Houston-Galveston Area Council 2035 Regional Transportation Plan

References

External links
Official website
Houston-Galveston Area Council 2035 Regional Transportation Plan

Texas Association of Regional Councils
Councils of governments